Hednesford Town Football Club is a football club based in Hednesford, Staffordshire, England.

History
The club was established in 1880 as a merger of the Red & Whites and Hill Top. Based at the Anglesey Hotel, they were sometimes known as Hednesford Anglesey. The club were founder members of the Birmingham & District League in 1889 and finished sixth in their first season. Despite finishing third in 1890–91, they left the league at the end of the season, and played only friendly matches before joining the Walsall & District Junior League in 1894. The club were runners-up in the league in their first two seasons, before the league was renamed the Walsall & District League in 1897.

Hednesford were league runners-up again in 1899–1900 and 1901–02. After finishing third in 1907–08, they joined the Birmingham Combination, which they won in 1909–10. After World War II the club rejoined the Birmingham & District League. They reached the first round of the FA Cup for the first time in 1919–20, losing 2–0 at Castleford Town. The club finished bottom of the league in 1924–25, 1925–26 and 1931–32. They withdrew from the league during the 1937–38 season and folded before reforming as Hednesford. The new club rejoined the Birmingham & District League for the 1937–39 season; however, with the league reduced to 10 clubs, two round robin leagues were played – the King's Cup, in which the club finished bottom of the table, and the League Cup, in which they finished second-from-bottom.

After World War II Hednesford joined the Birmingham Combination. They won the league in 1950–51 and were runners-up in 1952–53, after which they rejoined the Birmingham & District League. The league was split into two divisions for the 1954–55 season, with Hednesford playing in the Northern Division. A thirteenth-place finish saw them placed in Division Two the following season. They remained in Division Two until the league was reduced to a single division in 1960. In 1962 the league was renamed the West Midlands (Regional) League. Hednesford became members of the Premier Division when the league gained a second division in 1965. The club returned to its original name in 1971, and in 1972 they joined the Midland League. However, after finishing bottom of the table in 1973–77, the club left the league, returning to the Premier Division of the West Midlands (Regional) League. They were league champions in 1977–78, and after finishing as runners-up in 1983–84, the club moved up to the Midland Division of the Southern League.

In 1991–92 Hednesford were Midland Division runners-up, earning promotion to the Premier Division; they also reached the final of the Welsh Cup, losing 1–0 to Cardiff City. They won the Premier Division in 1994–95 and were promoted to the Football Conference. In their first season in the Conference the club finished third. The 1996–97 season saw the club reach the first round of the FA Cup for the first time since 1919–20. After beating Southport 2–1 in the first round, they defeated Second Division clubs Blackpool in the second round and York City in the third round, winning both games 1–0. In the fourth round they were drawn at home to Premier League Middlesbrough. However, the match was played at Boro's Riverside Stadium. In what was a close game Hednesford lost the tie 3–2.

The following season saw Hednesford entered directly into the first round of the FA Cup, where they defeated Hull City 2–0, before losing 1–0 to Darlington in the second round. The club reached the second round again in 1998–99, beating Barnet 1–0 in the first round before losing 3–1 at Cardiff City. A gradual decline in league performances saw them finish bottom of the table in 2000–01, resulting in relegation back to the Southern League's Premier Division. In 2003–04 the club reached the final of the FA Trophy, winning the competition with a 3–2 win over Canvey Island at Villa Park. In 2004–05 they finished fourth in the Premier Division, qualifying for the promotion play-offs; after beating Merthyr Tydfil 5–3 on penalties in the semi-finals after a 1–1 draw, they beat Chippenham Town 1–0 in the final to earn promotion to the Conference North.

Hednesford finished bottom of the Conference North in 2005–06, resulting in an immediate relegation, this time to the Premier Division of the Northern Premier League. In 2009 they were transferred to the Southern League's Premier Division, and a fourth-place finish in 2009–10 saw them qualify for the play-offs again, this time losing 2–0 to Chippenham in the semi-finals. They were Premier Division runners-up the following season; another play-off campaign saw them beat Leamington 3–1 in the semi-finals before losing 3–2 on penalties to Salisbury City in the final after the game had ended 2–2. The club were transferred back to the Northern Premier League in 2011 and finished fifth in 2011–12 before losing 5–0 to Bradford Park Avenue in the play-off semi-finals.

A fourth successive play-off campaign was secured when Hednesford were Premier Division runners-up in 2012–13. After beating AFC Fylde 3–1 on penalties in the semi-finals following a 3–3 draw, they defeated F.C. United of Manchester 2–1 in the final, earning promotion to the Conference North. Their first season back in the Conference North ended with a fourth-place finish and a play-off semi-final defeat to Altrincham, losing 4–3 on aggregate. In 2015–16 they finished second-from-bottom of the renamed National League North and were relegated to the Northern Premier League's Premier Division.

Ground

The club originally played at a ground behind the Anglesey Hotel, which became known as 'the Tins' due to the metal sheeting that was erected around the ground. In 1904 they moved to the Cross Keys ground after a local councillor agreed to pay off the club's £40 debt if they moved away from the Tins. The first match at the new stadium drew a crowd of 900 to see Hednesford beat Stafford 3–1. A large wooden stand was erected on one side of the pitch and banking on the other. The banking was replaced by a pitch-length stand in the 1950s and floodlights were installed in 1953, with over 7,000 attending the inauguration match in which local rivals Wolves defeated West Brom 4–2.

By the 1990s the capacity of Cross Keys had been reduced to around 4,000. The final match at the ground saw Hednesford beat Leek Town to secure the Southern League title and promotion to the Football Conference in front of 2,776 spectators. The club then moved to Keys Park, which was built at a cost of £1.3m. The ground initially had a capacity of 3,500, but was expanded during the 1997–98 season and now has a capacity of 6,039, of which 1,011 is seated and 5,335 covered.

Players

Current squad

Management and coaching staff

Current staff

Honours
FA Trophy
Winners 2003–04
Southern League
Premier Division champions 1994–95
League Cup winners 2010–11
Championship Trophy winners 1994–95
West Midlands (Regional) League
Champions 1940–41, 1977–78
League Cup winners 1962–63, 1983–84
Birmingham Combination
Champions 1909–10, 1950–51
Birmingham Senior Cup
Winners 1935–36, 2008–09, 2012–13
Staffordshire Senior Cup
Winners 1897–98, 1969–70, 1973–74, 2012–13

Records
Best FA Cup performance: Fourth round, 1996–97
Best FA Trophy performance: Winners, 2003–04
Best Welsh Cup performance: Finalists, 1991–92
Most appearances: Kevin Foster (470)
Most goals: Joe O'Connor (220)
Record transfer fee paid: £12,000 to Macclesfield Town for Steve Burr, 1992–93
Record transfer fee received: £40,000 from Arsenal for Cohen Bramall, 2017
Biggest win: 12–1 vs Redditch United, Birmingham Combination, 1952–53
Heaviest defeat: 15–0 vs Burton

See also
Hednesford Town F.C. players
Hednesford Town F.C. managers

References

External links 

Hednesford Town F.C Supporter's Association
HednesfordTown.com – the Hednesford Town statistics site

 
Football clubs in England
Football clubs in Staffordshire
Association football clubs established in 1880
1880 establishments in England
Hednesford
West Midlands (Regional) League
Staffordshire County League (South)
Birmingham Combination
Midland Football League (1889)
Southern Football League clubs
National League (English football) clubs
Northern Premier League clubs